Largest cannon may refer to:
List of the largest cannon by caliber, a list of the largest cannon throughout history
The largest individual cannon:
Tsar Cannon, the largest bombard
Little David and Mallet's Mortar, the largest artillery pieces by caliber